Filippo Cavalli (January 29, 1921 – April 29, 2004) was an Italian professional footballer who played as a goalkeeper.

Honours

Club
Torino
 Serie A champion: 1942–43.
 Coppa Italia winner: 1942–43.

Juventus
 Serie A champion: 1949–50, 1951–52.

References

 myjuve

1921 births
2004 deaths
Italian footballers
Serie A players
Casale F.B.C. players
Torino F.C. players
Como 1907 players
Juventus F.C. players
F.C. Pavia players
Association football goalkeepers